Madison was a Labrador Retriever, and an animal actor best known for playing the role of Vincent the dog on the television series Lost.  Even though she is female, she played a male dog on the show.

Biography
Madison is from Hawaii, and her owner is Kim Stahl, an accountant and part-time dog trainer.  Before becoming a performer, Madison worked as a tracking dog and obedience competitor.  In 2001, Madison ranked eighth among the best obedience dogs in Hawaii. 
Stahl also owns relatives of Madison, including two of her daughters, Byrddee and Jane.

Filmography
Lost (2004-2010)

See also
 List of individual dogs

References

External links

Honolulu Advertiser-"It's doggone great being part of 'Lost'"

1999 animal births
Dog actors